Letterfearn  is a settlement that lies of the western shore of Loch Duich in Skye and Lochalsh, Highlands of Scotland and is in the council area of Highland.

References

Populated places in Lochalsh